Joe DiGangi (December 1, 1914 – July 14, 2009) served as the New York Yankees bullpen catcher during the team's golden age – 1933 through 1941. He was born in the Greenpoint section of Brooklyn. He was also a Navy Seabee in the Pacific during World War II.  On July 4, 1939, DiGangi was warming up the Yankees starting pitcher in the bullpen when Lou Gehrig made his famous "Luckiest man on the face of the Earth" farewell speech.

References

1914 births
2009 deaths
Sportspeople from Brooklyn
Seabees
Major League Baseball bullpen catchers
People from Greenpoint, Brooklyn
United States Navy personnel of World War II
Military personnel from New York City